Utility-scale solar is large scale (sometimes defined as greater than 1 MW or sometimes 4 MWAC ) solar power either from:

A photovoltaic power station at a scale large enough to be classified as 'utility-scale'; or Concentrated solar power whereas rooftop solar is usually smaller. The utility-scale solar sector has led the overall U.S. solar market in terms of installed capacity since 2012. Increasingly batteries are co-located, in order to sell into the evening peak of the duck curve. Output voltages reach 1000VAC as of 2021. They can sometimes be agrovoltaics.

Utility-scale refers to electrical plant or equipment, whose operation, as an individual entity would cause a noticeable change in the operation of a utility.  For example, a single domestic PV panel, on its own has no discernible effect on the operation of a power network.  A 1 MW installation can impact on local voltage, and disturb system frequency.

In some countries it is competitive with wind power. In many countries it is cheaper than new fossil fuel power plants and in a few in the Middle East is becoming cheaper than existing fossil fuel plants as of 2021. The cost reduction is expected to spread to other countries.

References

Solar energy
Public utilities